Gwiezdny cyrk is a television show on the Polish television network Polsat. It was broadcast by Polsat. Agnieszka Popielewicz and Zygmunt Chajzer as the hosts, and the judges were: Maryla Rodowicz, Przemysław Saleta, Ewa Zalewska, Piotr Bałtroczyk.

I season

Scores 

2008 Polish television series debuts
2008 Polish television series endings
Polish reality television series
Polsat original programming